This is a list of notable works made with machinima techniques, both listed as any short films, feature films, and web series.

List

Feature films 
Any machinima films need to require more than forty minutes of film length.

Web short films / series

Other works inspired by or using machinima

Notes

References

 
—Also as:

Machinima works
Machinima works
Works